Soibada is a town in the Soibada Administrative Post, Manatuto District of East Timor.  Its population at the 2004 census was 2,692.

References 
 Statoids.com

External links

  – includes links to earlier articles

Populated places in East Timor
Manatuto Municipality